Hypoid gearboxes are gearboxes having axes that are non-intersecting and not parallel. The hypoid gearboxes are a subcategory of spiral bevel gearbox with the axes of gears at an offset from one another. In comparison to the conical geometry of a spiral bevel gear, the basic geometry of hypoid gear is hyperbolic. The spiral angle of the pinion is larger than the spiral angle of the gear in a hypoid gearbox, so the pinion diameter can be larger than that of a bevel gear pinion. This helps in attaining an enhanced contact surface and a better tooth strength which allows for higher gear ratios and scope of higher torque transmission. Bearings can also be used on both sides of gears for extra rigidity as the offset between the axes allows the scope for extra support.

Applications 
Hypoid gear sets have long been used in the differential (mechanical device) of rear wheel drive cars and trucks. The scope of misalignment between the centers of the two interlinking shafts permits utilization of larger sized gears which enhances the contact surface area and reduces the wear and tear on the gear hence extending the life and power transmission capabilities of the gearboxes. The reduction in friction also ensure reduction in the loss of energy and improve the overall efficiency of power transmission. This leads to a quieter running gear set.

References 

Mechanical power transmission